Punta Indio Naval Air Base is a military airport operated by the Argentine Naval Aviation, located in the countryside  northeast of Verónica, a town in the Buenos Aires Province of Argentina.

The Punta Indio VOR-DME (Ident: PDI) and non-directional beacon (Ident: PDI) are located on the field.

History 

Punta Indio Naval Air Base (Argentine Navy identifier: BAPI), the cradle of Argentine Naval Aviation, was established in 1928 on land that was donated by Martín Tornquist, who founded the nearby city of Verónica. The base was strategically located to control access by ship to the Río de la Plata, initially via manned balloons.

On 16 June 1955, Punta Indio was the departure base of the naval aircraft that bombarded the Casa Rosada attempting to kill president Juan Domingo Perón This action was the preface to the September uprising known as "Revolución Libertadora".

In April 1963, during the Navy uprising (part of the Azules y Colorados confrontation), rebel naval aircraft from Punta Indio attacked the loyalist 8th Tank Regiment; afterwards the air base was attacked by the loyalist Air Force and occupied by the Army.

During the National Reorganization Process, a Clandestine Detention Centre was active at Punta Indio.

In 2008 the First Naval Air Squadron was deactivated due to lack of budget.

In 2011, the 90th anniversary of the foundating of the Naval Aviation School was celebrated.

Units 
Punta Indio Naval Air Base is the location of the First Naval Air Force (Spanish: Fuerza Aeronaval N° 1), comprising the following units:
 Punta Indio Naval Air Base group
 Punta Indio Naval Air Workshop (Spanish: Taller Aeronaval Punta Indio)
 First Naval Air Wing (Spanish: Escuadra Aeronaval N° 1), composed of:
 Argentine Naval Aviation School (Spanish: Escuela de Aviación Naval)
 First Naval Air Attack Squadron (Spanish: Primera Escuadrilla Aeronaval de Ataque), currently on reserve
 Naval Air Maritime Patrol Squadron (Spanish: Escuadrilla Aeronaval de Vigilancia Marítima.

See also

Transport in Argentina
List of airports in Argentina

References

Further reading 
 BASES AERONAVALES DE LA ARMADA ARGENTINA – BASE AERONAVAL DE PUNTA INDIO (BAPI o PINDIO) 1- 1923 – 1935 (HistArMar website)  Accessed 9 August 2015
 BASES AERONAVALES DE LA ARMADA ARGENTINA – BASE AERONAVAL DE PUNTA INDIO (BAPI o PINDIO) 2- 1935 – 1961 (HistArMar website)  Accessed 9 August 2015
 BASES AERONAVALES DE LA ARMADA ARGENTINA – BASE AERONAVAL DE PUNTA INDIO (BAPI o PINDIO) 3- 1962 – 2009 (HistArMar website)  Accessed 9 August 2015

External links 
OpenStreetMap - Punta Indio Naval Air Base
OurAirports - Punta Indio Naval Air Base

Airports in Argentina
Buenos Aires Province
Military installations of Argentina
Argentine Naval Air Bases